An interface description language or interface definition language (IDL), is a generic term for a language that lets a program or object written in one language communicate with another program written in an unknown language. IDLs describe an interface in a language-independent way, enabling communication between software components that do not share one language, for example, between those written in C++ and those written in Java.

IDLs are commonly used in remote procedure call software. In these cases the machines at either end of the link may be using different operating systems and computer languages. IDLs offer a bridge between the two different systems.

Software systems based on IDLs include Sun's ONC RPC, The Open Group's Distributed Computing Environment, IBM's System Object Model, the Object Management Group's CORBA (which implements OMG IDL, an IDL based on DCE/RPC) and Data Distribution Service, Mozilla's XPCOM, Microsoft's Microsoft RPC (which evolved into COM and DCOM), Facebook's Thrift and WSDL for Web services.

Examples 

 AIDL: Java-based, for Android; supports local and remote procedure calls, can be accessed from native applications by calling through Java Native Interface (JNI)
 Apache Thrift: from Apache, originally developed by Facebook
 Avro IDL: for the Apache Avro system
 Concise Data Definition Language (CDDL, RFC 8610): A Notation for CBOR and JSON data structures
 CortoScript: Describe data and/or interfaces for systems that require Semantic interoperability
 Etch: Cisco's Etch Cross-platform Service Description Language
 Extensible Data Notation (EDN): Clojure data format, similar to JSON
FlatBuffers: Serialization format from Google supporting zero-copy deserialization
 Franca IDL: the open-source Franca interface definition language
 FIDL: Interface description language for the Fuchsia Operating System designed for writing app components in C, C++, Dart, Go and Rust. 
 IDL specification language: the original Interface Description Language
 IPL: Imandra Protocol Language
 JSON Web-Service Protocol (JSON-WSP)
 Lightweight Imaging Device Interface Language
 Microsoft Interface Definition Language (MIDL): the Microsoft extension of OMG IDL to add support for Component Object Model (COM) and Distributed Component Object Model (DCOM)
 OMG IDL: standardized by Object Management Group, used in CORBA (for DCE/RPC services) and DDS (for data modeling), also selected by the W3C for exposing the DOM of XML, HTML, and CSS documents
 OpenAPI Specification: a standard for REST interfaces, used by Swagger and other technologies. 
 Open Service Interface Definitions
 Protocol Buffers: Google's IDL
 RESTful Service Description Language (RSDL)
 Smithy: An AWS-invented protocol-agnostic interface definition language.
 Specification Language for Internet Communications Engine (Ice: Slice)
 Universal Network Objects: OpenOffice.org's component model
 Web Application Description Language (WADL)
 Web IDL: can be used to describe interfaces that are intended to be implemented in web browsers
 Web Services Description Language (WSDL)
 XCB: X protocol description language for X Window System
 Cross Platform Interface Description Language (XPIDL): Mozilla's way to specify XPCOM interfaces

See also 
 Component-based software engineering
 Interface-based programming
 Java Interface Definition Language
 List of computing and IT abbreviations
 Universal Interface Language
 User interface markup language

References

External links 
 Documenting Software Architecture: Documenting Interfaces (PDF)
 OMG Specification of OMG IDL
 OMG Tutorial on OMG IDL

Data modeling languages
Remote procedure call
Specification languages
Domain-specific programming languages